Vladimir Semakov (born 11 May 1985, Izhevsk) is a Russian (until 2014) and Ukrainian (since 2014) biathlete of the World Cup level. He participated at 2018 Winter Olympics.

Career
Being in Russian team Semakov participated only at one Junior World (in 2006 in Presque Isle, United States) and two European championships (in 2006 he had his best career results competing as junior and winning three gold medals; in 2010 he won silver in men's relay and was 6th in individual race). In 2009-10 season he had some good results at Russian Cup so he was invited to participate at IBU Cup. On 2 December 2010, he debuted in Biathlon World Cup in Swedish Östersund where he was 61st in individual race which was the worst result in Russian team in that race. After that he didn't participate in any other World Cup race as Russian athlete. His last race for Russia was on 17 December 2011, in IBU Cup in Austrian Obertilliach where he was 33rd in pursuit.

In summer 2014 Semakov together with Oleksander Zhyrnyi changed their citizenship to Ukrainian.

On 8 January 2015, he redebuted in World Cup in relay in Oberhof, Germany. He was second and unfortunately got a penalty loop but team managed to finish 5th. His first personal race for Ukraine he had next day when he finished just 79th in sprint. He participated in some more competitions that season but he didn't won any World Cup points. Three next seasons were more successful for him: he won some World Cup points and often ran in relay competitions. Up to date, his best World Cup result is 12th in sprint in Antholz-Anterselva in 2017-18 season. At 2017 World Championships he was 73rd in sprint and 6th in men's relay.

Semakov qualified to represent Ukraine at the 2018 Winter Olympics. He was 31st in individual and 78th in sprint.

Results

Winter Olympics

World Championships

World Cup

Rankings

IBU Cup

Individual podiums

Relay podiums

References

External links
 Profile on biathlon.com.ua
 Profile in IBU Database
 Profile in BiathlonRusBase

1985 births
Living people
Sportspeople from Izhevsk
Ukrainian male biathletes
Russian male biathletes
Russian emigrants to Ukraine
Naturalized citizens of Ukraine
Biathletes at the 2018 Winter Olympics
Olympic biathletes of Ukraine